Potiapua antonia is a species of beetle in the family Cerambycidae, the only species in the genus Potiapua.

References

Rhopalophorini
Monotypic beetle genera